Jinhua–Jiande high-speed railway or Jinjian railway is a high-speed railway line currently under construction in Zhejiang, China. It will be operated by China Railway Shanghai Group. Approximately 32% of the line will be in tunnels.

History 
Construction work officially began on 7 January 2020, at which point the completion date was set as 2024.

Stations 
Jinhua
Lanxi East
Dayang
Jiande

Route 
The line starts at Jinhua railway station and heads north. There are two intermediate stops: Lanxi East and Dayang railway station. The northern terminus is Jiande.

References 

High-speed railway lines in China
Rail transport in Zhejiang